Nathan "The Hog" Hedge (born 28 May 1979, in Brisbane, Queensland) is a professional surfer raised on the Northern Sydney beach of Narrabeen.

Having served his apprenticeship at the highly pressurised line-up of East Coast Australia's North Narrabeen, Nathan 'The Hog' Hedge has proven himself to be one of the areas most highly regarded sons. His style is characterised by both power and precision, while his control inside a barrel bares his own personal mark of determination.

Joining the Rip Curl team as an unabashed grom, Hog refined his competitive mettle surfing some of the best waves in the world alongside some of the greatest surfers in the world, thanks to 'The Search' campaign.

Hog qualified for the ASP World Tour in 2001, and quickly established himself as the unofficial spokesman for all things Australian. Never afraid to voice his opinions, his tenacity and honesty has both riled and endeared. By 2004 and 2005 The Hog had looked to cement his position amongst the top ten surfers in the world. Two runner-up finishes in 2004 at Teahupoo and J’Bay, consistent quarter-final finishes in 2005, it was only a dislocated shoulder in Tahiti and Hawaii in 2004 which had any effect on his momentum.

After an inexplicable run of poor results in 2006, Hog was relegated to the World Qualifying Series (WQS). The only plus being the award from ‘Surfer Magazine’ for best tube ride, a sickening left-hander which barrels beyond comprehension.

Although his efforts on The Grind in 2007 and 2008 have come excruciatingly close, most still believe that his rightful place is amongst the world's top 45.

2009 will be his third year on the WQS.

Career highlights
2001
ASP World Tour Ranking: 25th

Quarter-Finals – Rio Surf International, (Rio de Janeiro, Brazil)

2002
ASP World Tour Ranking: 20th

Quarter-Finals – Rip Curl Pro, (Bells Beach, Australia)

2003
ASP World Tour Ranking: 24th

Semi-Finals – Billabong Pro, (Mundaka, Spain)

2004
ASP World Tour Ranking: 7th

Runner-up – Billabong Pro, (Teahupoo, Tahiti)
Runner-up – Billabong Pro, (Jeffrey's Bay, South Africa)
Quarter-Finals – Boost Mobile Pro, (Trestles, USA)
Quarter-Finals – Nova Schin Festival, (Florianopolis, Brazil)

2005
ASP World Tour Ranking: 8th

Quarter-Finals – Billabong Pro, (Teahupoo, Tahiti)
Quarter-Finals – Rip Curl Search, (St Leu, Reunion Island)
Quarter-Finals – Quiksilver Pro, (Hossegor, France)
Semi-Finals – Nova Schin Festival, (Florianopolis, Brazil)

2007
Winner – O'Neill Cold Water Classic(WQS), (Thurso, Scotland)

References
ASP World Tour
Rip Curl

External links
Rip Curl Team Profile Page
Mick, Myself and Eugene Extra Free As A Hog
Rip Curl Moroccan Surf Trip
Stab Magazine Littleweeds Interview
2006 Surfer Magazine Award for Best Tube

Living people
World Surf League surfers
1979 births
Australian surfers
People from New South Wales